Donald Isaac Jones Sr. (born July 7, 1966) is an American college basketball coach and former college basketball player. He is currently the men's head basketball coach at Stetson University. Prior to Stetson, Jones served as the head coach of the UCF Knights men's basketball team from 2010 to 2016 and at Marshall from 2007–2010.

After spending three years as head coach at Marshall, amassing a 55–41 record, Jones was hired by UCF after the university decided not to retain Kirk Speraw for the 2010–11 season. Before Marshall, Jones was an assistant with the Florida Gators for 11 seasons, and was hired by Marshall after he helped Billy Donovan coach the Gators to consecutive national championships in 2006 and 2007. Afterwards, Jones joined the Knights in 2010, serving as their third head coach since entering into Division I play.  On March 10, 2016, Jones was fired after the team's second consecutive first round loss in the American Athletic Conference tournament.

In the 2016–17 season, Jones worked as a scout for the Los Angeles Clippers of the NBA. Jones returned to college coaching in April 2017 as an assistant at Wichita State under Gregg Marshall.

In July 2018, Jones was hired by the University of Dayton as assistant coach under Anthony Grant. The 2 previously served together as assistant coaches at Marshall from 1994–96 and at Florida from 1996-2006.

On March 29, 2019, Jones was named the 22nd head coach at Stetson University.

Head coaching record

* UCF had its wins from the 2010–11 season vacated after it was ruled that there was an ineligible player for the Knights.

Personal life
Jones is married to Michelle Jones. They have three children.

References

External links
UCF Knights bio
Marshall Thundering Herd bio
Florida Gators bio

1966 births
Living people
American men's basketball coaches
American men's basketball players
Basketball coaches from West Virginia
Basketball players from West Virginia
College men's basketball head coaches in the United States
Dayton Flyers men's basketball coaches
Florida Gators men's basketball coaches
Marshall Thundering Herd men's basketball coaches
People from Point Pleasant, West Virginia
Pikeville Bears men's basketball players
Pikeville Bears men's basketball coaches
UCF Knights men's basketball coaches
Wichita State Shockers men's basketball coaches